Adrienne Rivera is an American para-alpine skier. She represented the United States at the 1994 Winter Paralympics in four events in alpine skiing.

She was diagnosed with bone cancer and as a result lost a leg at the age of 14. Following her career in sports she became an aerospace engineer.

She won the gold medal in the Women's Giant Slalom LW2 event and the bronze medal in the Women's Super-G LW2 event.

She also competed in the Women's Downhill LW2 event and the Women's Slalom LW2 event but did not win a medal.

See also 
 List of Paralympic medalists in alpine skiing

References 

Living people
Year of birth missing (living people)
Place of birth missing (living people)
Paralympic alpine skiers of the United States
American female alpine skiers
Alpine skiers at the 1994 Winter Paralympics
Medalists at the 1994 Winter Paralympics
Paralympic gold medalists for the United States
Paralympic bronze medalists for the United States
Paralympic medalists in alpine skiing
American amputees
21st-century American women